Bythinella carinulata is a species of very small freshwater snail, an aquatic gastropod mollusk in the family Amnicolidae. This snail is endemic to France.

References

Bythinella
Gastropods described in 1868
Taxonomy articles created by Polbot